Cursing the Sea is the debut studio album by Irish pop band September Girls. It was released in the UK in January 2014 under Fortuna Pop!.

Track list

Critical reception
Cursing the Sea received positive reviews from critics. The album currently holds a score of 72 on review aggregator website Metacritic indicating "generally favorable reviews".

Noel Gardner, music critic with NME, described the album's sound as "bursting with the spirit of the Ramones circa ‘End Of The Century’ while also stating that "Caoimhe Derwin and Jessie Ward’s guitars have perfected that Jesus And Mary Chain kettle-whistle sound". Robin Murray of Clash (magazine) gave Cursing the Sea a 7 out of 10 score, describing the record as 'a thrilling ride that adds dangerous shades of noir to that jangle-pop format".

Personnel

September Girls
 Paula Cullen - Vocals, Lead Bass
 Caoimhe Derwin - Vocals, Rhythm Guitar
 Lauren Kerchner - Vocals, Keys
 Jessie Ward - Vocals, Lead Guitar
 Sarah Grimes - Drums

Technical personnel
 Recorded by Robbie Brady and Séan Goucher

References

2014 debut albums
September Girls albums
Fortuna Pop! Records albums